Leo Lemešić (8 June 1908 in Sinj – 15 August 1978 in Split) was a Croatian football striker and later a football manager. He became a referee in his later years.

Club career
He spent his entire club career with Hajduk Split. In total, Lemešić scored 455 goals in 491 games, making him Hajduk's second most goalscorer, and tenth most capped player. He played his first senior game in 1926.

International career
Lemešić made his debut for Yugoslavia in a May 1929 King Alexander's Cup match against Romania and earned a total of 5 caps, scoring 3 goals. His final international was a May 1932 friendly match against Poland.

References 

 Živković, Đuro. Hajduk Split: 100 Godina Bili. N.p.: Vlastita Naklada, n.d. Print.

External links
 
  Player profile on Serbian National Team page

1908 births
1978 deaths
People from Sinj
Association football forwards
Yugoslav footballers
Yugoslavia international footballers
HNK Hajduk Split players
Yugoslav First League players
Yugoslav football managers
RNK Split managers
Yugoslavia national football team managers
HNK Hajduk Split managers
Croatian football referees
1950 FIFA World Cup referees
Burials at Lovrinac Cemetery